Cheval is an unincorporated census-designated place in Hillsborough County, Florida, United States. The population was 10,702 at the 2010 census, up from 7,602 at the 2000 census.

Geography
Cheval is located in northwestern Hillsborough County at  (28.146418, -82.515623). It is bordered to the east by Lutz, to the south by Northdale, to the west by Keystone, and to the north by Pasco County. Florida State Road 597 (Dale Mabry Highway) forms part of the CDP eastern border, and State Road 589 (Suncoast Parkway) forms part of the western border.

Demographics

As of the census of 2000, there were 7,602 people, 3,407 households, and 2,047 families residing in the community. The racial makeup of the community was 85.86% White, 4.63% African American, 0.18% Native American, 5.01% Asian, 0.16% Pacific Islander, 2.12% from other races, and 2.04% from two or more races. Hispanic or Latino of any race were 13.02% of the population.

There were 3,407 households, out of which 30.5% had children under the age of 18 living with them, 47.8% were married couples living together, 8.9% had a female householder with no husband present, and 39.9% were non-families. 32.9% of all households were made up of individuals, and 6.3% had someone living alone who was 65 years of age or older.  The average household size was 2.23 and the average family size was 2.88.

In the community the population was spread out, with 23.2% under the age of 18, 7.5% from 18 to 24, 37.5% from 25 to 44, 23.9% from 45 to 64, and 7.9% who were 65 years of age or older.  The median age was 36 years. For every 100 females, there were 95.3 males.  For every 100 females age 18 and over, there were 91.7 males.

The median income for a household in the community was $46,888, and the median income for a family was $65,960. Males had a median income of $45,551 versus $29,161 for females. The per capita income for the community was $32,444.  About 2.5% of families and 4.9% of the population were below the poverty line, including 6.2% of those under age 18 and 2.2% of those age 65 or over.

References

Census-designated places in Hillsborough County, Florida
Census-designated places in Florida